Hereford College of Education was a teacher training college in the English city of Hereford. The college was established in 1902 and was the only higher education institution in the county of Herefordshire throughout its existence. It provided training for teachers – initially two-year courses leading to the Certificate in Education and later three-year courses. For much of its existence it was an all-female college. The college, which was a constituent college of the University of Birmingham, operated for many years before closing in 1978 after cost-cutting measures by the Government of the time which included a reduction in the number of teacher training programmes. The Government was also keen to restructure the way the subject was studied, encouraging universities to offer teacher training rather than specialist colleges.

At the time of its closure the college was the oldest local education authority teacher training college in the United Kingdom. The campus, located in College Road, was taken over by the Royal National College for the Blind in late 1978, before becoming the degree level campus for  Hereford College of Arts in 2013.

Cornish writer D. M. Thomas was an English lecturer at Hereford College of Education from 1963 until he was made redundant upon its closure in 1978.

References

Gallery

See also

 Bedford College of Higher Education

Teacher training colleges in the United Kingdom
Higher education colleges in Herefordshire
Educational institutions established in 1902
Educational institutions disestablished in 1977
Defunct universities and colleges in England
Royal National College for the Blind
Buildings and structures in Hereford
1902 establishments in England